Kings Park is a station on the Port Jefferson Branch of the Long Island Rail Road. It is located at the southwest corner of Suffolk CR 14 (Indian Head Road) and NY 25A (Main Street) in Kings Park, New York.

History
Originally known as St. Johnsland station when it was built by Charles Hallett of Riverhead for the Smithtown and Port Jefferson Railroad between November and December 1872, it was renamed Kings Park station in June 1891. The Kings Park area was the site of a major derailment on February 16, 1947, but there were no casualties. The station was rebuilt in 1948 with an attached freight storage area, and rebuilt again during the 1990s. Kings Park station also had a spur called the Kings Park Psychiatric Center Spur to the former Kings Park Psychiatric Center, which was originally built in 1896, and officially decommissioned in 1971, although trains were used to bring coal to the hospital until 1987. Today the right-of-way serves as the Kings Park Hike and Bike Trail, which leads to the Nissequogue River State Park.

Station layout
This station has two high-level side platforms, each 12 cars long. On either side of the station, the tracks merge into a single track. Most trains stop at Platform B, though Platform A sees some occasional passing trains.

References

External links

Kings Park State Hospital Spur (Unofficial LIRR History)
Kings Park State Hospital Spur (Arrt's Arrchives)
Kings Park Station History (Steve Lynch's LIRR Maps, Photos, Charts, etc.) (TrainsAreFun.com)
Station from Indian Head Road from Google Maps Street View
FOX Interlocking (The LIRR Today)

Long Island Rail Road stations in Suffolk County, New York
Smithtown, New York
Railway stations in the United States opened in 1872